Carnes is a small unincorporated community in southern Forrest County, Mississippi. It is part of the Hattiesburg, Mississippi Metropolitan Statistical Area.

History 
Carnes was settled in 1905 and was originally named Helena. Its name was changed to Carnes in honor of John Carnes, an early settler. Carnes is located on the former Gulf and Ship Island Railroad and was once home to two pine lumber mills and the Red Creek Lumber Company.

A post office operated under the name Carnes from 1905 to 1934.

Geography 
Carnes is located at latitude 30.9935178, longitude -89.2597811.

Education 
Carnes is served by the Forrest County Public School System.
 Forrest County Agricultural High School
 South Forrest Attendance Center

Industry 
 Florida Gas Transmission Company - transports natural gas to over 240 delivery points through a 5,000-mile pipeline that extends from Texas to Florida

Places of worship 
 Sandhill Baptist Church
 First Baptist Church

Cemeteries 
 J.E. Bounds Memorial Cemetery
 Lee-Davis Cemetery
 Seal Cemetery

References

External links
 Black Creek Watershed
 Transcription of tombstones in Mill Creek Cemetery

Unincorporated communities in Mississippi
Unincorporated communities in Forrest County, Mississippi
Hattiesburg metropolitan area